Sethum Ayiram Pon: Roots is a 2019 Tamil-language drama film directed by Anand Ravichandran in his directorial debut. The film stars Srilekha Rajendran, Nivedhithaa Sathish, and Avinash Raghudevan in the lead roles. The film was released directly through online streaming services after showing in select film festivals.

Plot 
The film follows  the story of Krishnaveni (Srilekha Rajendran), an oppari singer, and her 23-year-old granddaughter, Meera (Nivedhithaa Sathish), who is a make-up artiste, after a period of separation. It explores the relationship between Meera and her grandmother after years of separation, the resolution of their conflict and how Meera finds her roots within rural life and its traditions.

Cast 

 Nivedhithaa Sathish as Meera (Kunjamma), an upcoming make-up artiste
 Srilekha Rajendran as Krishnaveni, Meera's grandmother
 Avinash Raghudevan as Kuberan, a make-up artiste for dead bodies
 Gabriella Sellus as Amudha, Meera's friend
 Mosakutty Rajendran as Bahubali
 Rathaakrishnan as Sangudevan
 Vichitran as Muthupandi
 Aishwarya as Rani
 Kousalya Devi as Usidha
Dharma as Pechiyamma 
Vasantha Devi as Angamma
Akash as Chembiyan
Sanjay as Marudhu
Kalimangalam Muniyammal as Muniyammal
Pandiyamma as Pandiyamma

Production 
The film is directed by Anand Ravichandran, a former software official in his second project after he had previously directed the short film Kuberanum Irandu Gundargalum. Ravichandran began research on oppari, an ancient way of mourning the dead, for the film. He added that the research took to learn about Ethiopia and other rice-eating cultures including Mexico where death is celebrated, which prompted him to write it as a story.

Television actress Srilekha Rajendran and Nivedhithaa Sathish (of Sillu Karupatti fame) play the lead roles. Nivedhithaa revealed that she plays an angry woman who is still trying to figure out her life. Ravichandran stated that "The idea was to draw a parallel between the two women whose ideologies are similar despite belonging to different backgrounds". Real oppari artists were used in the film.

The film was shot in 17 days in Appanur near Paramakudi. Ravichandran added that the weather and the "pin-drop silence" in the location were considered to be "challenging during the shoot", with Nivedhithaa adding that the team had to retake a few scenes when a sound in the background interfered. Since Ravichandran felt that he could not create the ambience of the sound during dubbing, the team preferred to use sync sound technology.

Soundtrack 

The film score and eight-song soundtrack is composed by Shamanth Nag who also wrote lyrics for four of the tracks, along with Raghavan and Ravi. The album also features three songs with traditional folk lyrics.

Release 
Sethum Aayiram Pon was showcased at the New York Indian Film Festival on 8 May 2019 and also screened at other film festivals. The film released directly through Netflix on 1 April 2020 bypassing theatrical release due to the COVID-19 pandemic.

Reception 
Haricharan Puddpeddi of the Hindustan Times gave the film a positive review and wrote that "Anand Ravichandran's directorial debut does not have a single dull moment". Shubhra Gupta of The Indian Express wrote that "Both Sathish and Rajendran work well together, and as they head towards an unexpected finish, we see what the director wants us to: blood will tell, and life, with all its pain and problems, is a celebration". Pradeep Kumar of The Hindu reviewed the film as "poignant" and "ironical", and further added "the title stands to suggest the worth of relationships the lead character learns about, which, for her, happens only in the event of a death". Behindwoods reviewed the film as a "bittersweet drama on dysfunctional relationships with an interesting backdrop".

Ashameera Aiyyappan of Cinema Express wrote "With a lot of lazy charm that is distinctive of rural life, Sethum Aayiram Pon is a film that takes its time to get going, like pastoral life". Baradwaj Rangan of Film Companion South wrote "The film works because there's grace, there's a quiet dignity. Even a technique as flashy as a whip-pan becomes (almost) unobtrusive [...] the drama unfolds confidently, and with touches of humour and the flavourful dialogues are a big help"; He further lauded the film's cinematographer Manikantan Krishnamachary stating that "the shots are held for long and there's so much happening that the techniques serve the story instead of overpowering it".

Awards and nominations

References

External links 
 

Indian drama films
2019 drama films
2019 films